Kung Aagawin Mo ang Lahat sa Akin (When All Is Gone) is a 1987 Philippine drama film directed by Eddie Garcia. The film stars Sharon Cuneta and Jackie Lou Blanco. The film centers around an intense sibling rivalry between a younger daughter named Gladys and older sibling named Maureen who was adopted before she was born.

Plot
The story revolves around sisters Gladys (Jackie Lou Blanco) and her adopted older sister Maureen (Sharon Cuneta). Their father Gilbert (Dante Rivero) treats both daughters with love and treats them fairly, while their mother Clara (Laurice Guillen), favors Gladys. Because of this, Gladys grew up into a selfish brat who wants everything that her sister owns, including the man that she loves.

Cast
 Sharon Cuneta as Maureen Andrada
 Mary Grace Ortaleza as Baby Maureen
 Vina Morales as Young Maureen
 Jackie Lou Blanco as Gladys Andrada
 Karen Ann Gil as Young Gladys
 Tonton Gutierrez as Troy
 Ricky Davao as Arvin
 Laurice Guillen as Clara Andrada
 Dante Rivero as Gilbert Andrada
 Luis Gonzales as Don Victor Samaniego
 Rosemarie Gil as Donya Romina Samaniego
 Alicia Alonzo as Yaya Rosita
 Francis Magalona as Dino 
 Ali Sotto as Joyce 
 Aurora Salve as Vicky
 Martin Santos as Mikey
 Rose Rosado as Marivic
 Ester Chavez as Dra. Corpuz
 Ernie Zarate as Dr. Fernando

Adaptations
In 2009, the film was adapted by GMA Network into a series as part of the Sine Novela installment. Maxene Magalona played the role Maureen while Glaiza de Castro as Gladys followed by Jackie Rice as Mercedita in the version of the series (not included in the movie). Jackie Lou Blanco played the role of Donya Clara this time.

References

External links

1987 films
Filipino-language films
Philippine drama films
Viva Films films